Aleksandar Gajić (born 14 January 1983) is a Serbian former professional basketball player.

Professional career 
A point guard, Gajić played for Partizan, Crvena zvezda, Lukoil Academic, Sloga, Bosna, APOEL, Khimik, Igokea, Ilysiakos, Swisslion Takovo, Napredak Kruševac, and AEK Larnaca. He retired as a player with AEK Larnaca in 2012.

National team career 
In July 1999, Gajić was a member of the Yugoslavia U16 national team that won the gold medal at the European Championship for Cadets in Slovenia. Over eight tournament games, he averaged 6.9 points, 1.2 rebounds and 1.2 assists per game. At the tournament's end, he picked up the Most Valuable Player award.

In July 2000, Gajić was a member of the Yugoslavia U18 team that won the gold medal at the FIBA Europe Under-18 Championship in Zadar, Croatia. Over five tournament games, he averaged 3 points, 1.2 rebounds and 1.8 assists per game.

Career achievements
 YUBA League champion: 1  (with Partizan: 2001–02)
 Bulgarian National League champion: 1  (with Lukoil Academic: 2003–04)
 Yugoslav Cup winner: 1  (with Partizan: 2001–02)
 Bulgarian Cup winner: 1  (with Lukoil Academic: 2003–04)
 Cup of Bosnia and Herzegovina winner: 1  (with Igokea: 2006–07)

References

External links
 Aleksandar Gajic at eurobasket.com
 Aleksandar Gajic at euroleague.net

1983 births
Living people
Basketball players from Belgrade
ABA League players
AEK Larnaca B.C. players
APOEL B.C. players
Basketball League of Serbia players
BC Khimik players
Ilysiakos B.C. players
KK Bosna Royal players
KK Crvena zvezda players
KK Igokea players
KK Lions/Swisslion Vršac players
KK Napredak Kruševac players
KK Partizan players
KK Sloga players
PBC Academic players
Point guards
Serbian expatriate basketball people in Bosnia and Herzegovina
Serbian expatriate basketball people in Bulgaria
Serbian expatriate basketball people in Cyprus
Serbian expatriate basketball people in Greece
Serbian expatriate basketball people in Ukraine
Serbian men's basketball players